Chanda Bwalya is a Zambian football player. He formerly played for Terengganu FA in Malaysia. He is also a former Zambia national football team player.

References 

Living people
Zambian footballers
Year of birth missing (living people)
Zambian expatriate footballers
Zambian expatriate sportspeople in Malaysia
Expatriate footballers in Malaysia
Terengganu FC players
Association footballers not categorized by position